Minnedosa Airport  is located  northeast of Minnedosa, Manitoba, Canada.

References

Registered aerodromes in Manitoba